USS John R. Perry (DE-1034) was a  in the United States Navy. The ship was launched on 29 July 1958 and was commissioned on 5 May 1959. The vessel was used as a school ship for anti-submarine warfare on the United States East Coast until 1966, when John R. Perry transferred to the Pacific. The destroyer escort was struck from the Naval Vessel Register on 20 February 1973 and transferred to Indonesia. The vessel was renamed KRI Samadikun and initially given the pennant number D-1, before being reclassified DE-341 in 1982. Samadikun was decommissioned in 2003.

Construction and career
John R. Perry was laid down on 1 October 1957 by Avondale Marine Ways in Avondale, Louisiana. The destroyer escort was  launched on 29 July 1958, sponsored by Mrs. John R. Perry, widow of Rear Admiral Perry. The vessel was commissioned on 5 May 1959.

John R. Perry made a shakedown cruise to Northern Europe and Scandinavian countries, thence sailed to Guantanamo Bay, Cuba. She then became a school ship for the Fleet Sonar School, basing at Key West, Florida, for anti-submarine warfare operations that took her to principal Caribbean and Gulf of Mexico ports, sailing as far east as the Azores, and up the eastern seaboard to Norfolk, Virginia. She was one of the Atlantic Fleet's warships responding to the President John F. Kennedy's call for a quarantine of Cuba (24 October – 20 November 1962) during the Cuban Missile Crisis. She patrolled off the island to enforce the blockade.

John R. Perry resumed sonar schoolship duties out of Key West which continued through 1965. This principal service was interrupted by overhauls in the Charleston Navy Yard, special anti-submarine warfare tactics in the Caribbean and along the eastern seaboard with Task Force Alpha, and joint operations with units of the Venezuelan Navy (2–8 February 1964). During these years John R. Perry helped train the men of the Navy in the latest ASW techniques.

John R. Perry was transferred to the Pacific Fleet on 1 May 1966. She departed Key West on the 16th, transited the Panama Canal three days later, and arrived Pearl Harbor on 4 June to operate in the Hawaiian area through mid-1967.

Transfer to Indonesia
She was decommissioned in the early 1970s, struck from the Naval Vessel Register on 20 February 1973 and transferred to Indonesia. There she was renamed Samadikun (D-1)', reclassified as DE-341 in 1982. She was decommissioned in 2003.

References

External links
 Photo gallery at Navsource.org

 

Claud Jones-class destroyer escorts
Ships built in Bridge City, Louisiana
1958 ships